Luis Lopez (born October 5, 1973 in Brooklyn, New York) is a former Major League Baseball third baseman and first baseman. He played parts of two seasons in the major leagues: 2001 for the Toronto Blue Jays and 2004 for the Montreal Expos. In 2005, he played in Nippon Professional Baseball for the Tohoku Rakuten Golden Eagles. He last played for the Bridgeport Bluefish of the Atlantic League in 2013.

Career
Lopez began his professional career in 1995 with the independent St. Paul Saints, then playing in the Northern League. He was signed by the Blue Jays the following year. Since 2005, Lopez has played in various independent leagues as well as in the Mexican League.

He now coaches baseball as head coach of the New York Nighthawks 12U and 16U teams and as the assistant coach for The Harvey School.

References

External links

1973 births
Living people
Acereros de Monclova players
American expatriate baseball players in Canada
American expatriate baseball players in Japan
American expatriate baseball players in Mexico
Baseball players from New York (state)
Bridgeport Bluefish players
Cafeteros de Córdoba players
Camden Riversharks players
Coastal Carolina Chanticleers baseball players
Edmonton Trappers players
Hagerstown Suns players
Knoxville Smokies players
Leones de Yucatán players
Lincoln Saltdogs players
Major League Baseball first basemen
Major League Baseball third basemen
Montreal Expos players
Mexican League baseball first basemen
Mexican League baseball third basemen
Nippon Professional Baseball first basemen
Nippon Professional Baseball third basemen
North Shore Spirit players
Ogden Raptors players
Petroleros de Minatitlán players
Richmond Braves players
Sacramento River Cats players
St. Paul Saints players
St. Catharines Stompers players
Syracuse SkyChiefs players
Toronto Blue Jays players
Tohoku Rakuten Golden Eagles players
York Revolution players